Gemini Man may refer to:

 Gemini Man (film), a 2019 American science fiction film
 Gemini Man (TV series), a 1976 American science fiction TV series
 Gemini Man, a Robot Master from the Mega Man video game franchise

See also
 Gemini (disambiguation)